Orley May (February 16, 1897 - January 1968) was an American detective in Cleveland, Ohio in the 1930s. May is known for working on the Cleveland Torso Murderer case.

References 

James Jessen Badal; In the Wake of the Butcher: Cleveland's Torso Murders; The Kent State University Press;  (paperback, 2001)
Steven Nickel; Torso: Eliot Ness and the Search for a Psychopathic Killer; John F Blair Publishers;  (paperback, 2001)

1897 births
1968 deaths
American police detectives